David Philander (born 4 January 1987) is a rugby union winger who plays for the  and the Namibian national rugby union team.
Philander made his debut for the Namibia in 2008 and was part of the squad at the 2015 Rugby World Cup.

References

External links

Living people
1987 births
Namibian rugby union players
Namibia international rugby union players
Rugby union players from Windhoek
Rugby union wings